Goodenia angustifolia  is a species of flowering plant in the family Goodeniaceae and is endemic to northern Australia. It is a prostrate or ascending herb with linear, channelled, needle-shaped leaves, and racemes of bright yellow flowers with leaf-like bracteoles at the base.

Description
Goodenia angustifolia is a prostrate or ascending herb with glabrous, glaucous foliage. Flowering has been observed in August.

Taxonomy and naming
Goodenia angustifolia was first formally described in 1980 by Roger Charles Carolin in the journal Telopea from material he collected near Nockatunga in 1964. The specific epithet (angustifolia) means "narrow-leaved".

Distribution and habitat
This goodenia grows on stony downs near the type location in Queensland, but has also been recorded along roadsides and in other arid areas of the Northern Territory.

References

angustifolia
Flora of Queensland
Flora of the Northern Territory
Plants described in 1980
Taxa named by Roger Charles Carolin